The 48th South American Championships in Athletics were held at the Parque de Atletismo Campo Elías Gutiérrez in Cartagena, Colombia, between July 5-7, 2013. 

A total of 44 events were contested, 22 by men and 22 by women. 

Detailed reports on the championships were given by Eduardo Biscayart.

Records
One new area record in pole vault, as well as seven new South American Championships records and a couple of other (mainly national) records were set.

Medal summary

The results were published by the Federación Colombiana de Atletismo.

Men

Women

Medal table (unofficial)

Team trophies
Brazil won the team trophies in all three categories.

Total

Men

Women

Participation
All 13 member federations of CONSUDATLE were participating summing up to about 322 athletes.

 (27)
 (5)
 (78)
 (14)
 (69)
 (31)
 (3)
 Panama (14)
 (8)
 Perú (29)
 (1)
 (6)
 (37)

References

External links

South American Championships in Athletics
South American Championships in Athletics
South American Championships in Athletics
Sport in Cartagena, Colombia
2013 in South American sport
International athletics competitions hosted by Colombia